The Battle of Baduhenna Wood was a battle, possibly fought near Heiloo, Netherlands, in 28 AD between the Frisii and a Roman army led by the Roman general Lucius Apronius.

The earliest mention of the Frisii tells of Drusus' 12 BC war against the Rhine Germans and the Chauci. The Romans did not attack them after devastating the lands of the Rhine Germans, but merely passed through their territory and along their coast in order to attack the Chauci. The account says that the Frisii were "won over", suggesting a Roman suzerainty was imposed. When Drusus brought Roman forces through Frisii lands in 12 BC and "won them over", he placed a moderate tax on them. However, a later Roman governor raised the requirements and exacted payment, at first decimating the herds of the Frisii, then confiscating their land, and finally taking wives and children into bondage. By AD 28 the Frisii had had enough. They hanged the Roman soldiers collecting the tax and forced the governor to flee to a Roman fort, which they then besieged. 

According to Tacitus:

For whatever reason, the Romans did not seek revenge and the matter was closed. The prestige of the Frisii among the neighboring Germanic tribes was raised considerably.

See also 

 Baduhenna
 Third Servile War

References

Sources

28
20s conflicts
Baduhenna Wood 28
Frisii
Military history of Germany
Baduhenna Wood 28
Baduhenna Wood
20s in the Roman Empire
1st-century battles